Holy War is the third studio album by Australian deathcore band Thy Art Is Murder. It was released on 26 June 2015 through UNFD and Nuclear Blast. The album was produced and mixed by Will Putney, recorded in late 2014. Music videos were released for the tracks "Light Bearer" on 29 May, and for "Holy War" on 29 June. Holy War had a successful first week of sales, charting at No. 7 in Australia and No. 82 in the U.S. as well as several other U.S. Charts.

Lyrical content 
As opposed to previous albums, Holy War focuses on the subjects of child abuse, animal rights, religion, politics, and war.

Cover art 
It was revealed on 24 April, Thy Art had originally chosen a different cover artwork showing a child suicide bomber. After the original album cover was presented to distributors and retailers, the band was requested to either cover the artwork or choose a different design. The original artwork is within the packaging and printed on the vinyl cover.

Critical reception 

Holy War received mostly positive reviews from critics. Writing for Rolling Stone Australia, Sally McNullen gave the album four of five stars and described the album as "their darkest and most technically complex release yet," while noting that the band "don't stray too far from their sonic roots." Writing for Metal Hammer, Jason Hicks gave the album the same score. He wrote that in comparison to previous releases the band are "noticeably more focused and ferocious in their attack," concluding that "The end result is unquestionably Thy Art Is Murder's best release to date – one that undoubtedly cements their name among the best death metal bands out there today."

Bradly Zorgdrager's review for Exclaim! was similarly positive, awarding the album 7/10. He wrote that "Holy War carves finds a happy medium between the soul-sucking breakdowns of their last release and the eccentric pyrotechnics of their first. There are more emotions than merely the titular Hate of their last, and the soaring solos sound positively triumphant." However he criticised some aspects of the band's sound, finishing his review by noting that "Though the album could do without the all-too-clichéd ominous riffs over chugs – let's call them chugly passages – it's a small price to pay for this victory."

The album was included at number 18 on Rock Sounds top 50 releases of 2015 list.

Track listing

Credits 
Writing, performance and production credits are adapted from the album liner notes.

Personnel

Thy Art Is Murder
 Chris "CJ" McMahon – vocals
 Andy Marsh – lead guitar
 Sean Delander – bass, rhythm guitar
 Lee Stanton – drums

Guest musicians
 Winston McCall of Parkway Drive – vocals on "Coffin Dragger"

Production
 Will Putney – production, engineering, mixing
 Randy Leboeuf – additional engineering
 Steve Seid – editing
 Tom Smith Jr. – editing
 Ted Jensen – mastering

Design and artwork
 Andy Marsh – art direction
 Thomas Savage – photography
 Sebastian Lux – design, layout
 Musician known as R%
Studios
 Graphic Nature Audio, Belleville, NJ, U.S. – recording, mixing
 Sterling Sound, New York City, NY, U.S. – mastering

Charts

Release history

References 
 Citations

Sources

External links 
 
 Holy War at Nuclear Blast

2015 albums
Thy Art Is Murder albums
Nuclear Blast albums
UNFD albums
Albums produced by Will Putney
Songs critical of religion